Gheyzaniyeh-ye Bozorg (also Romanized as Gheyzānīyeh-ye Bozorg; also known as Gheyzānīyeh, Ghezānīyeh, and Qeyzānīyeh-ye Bozorg) is a village in Gheyzaniyeh Rural District, in the Central District of Ahvaz County, Khuzestan Province, Iran. At the 2006 census, its population was 2,121, in 350 families.

References 

Populated places in Ahvaz County